Alexander Lindsay, 4th Earl of Balcarres (died 25 July 1736) was a Scottish peer.

Alexander Lindsay was born the son of Colin Lindsay, 3rd Earl of Balcarres and Lady Margaret Campbell. He inherited his title on the death of his father in 1722. He married in 1718 Elizabeth Scott, the daughter of David Scott of Scotstarvet.

He joined the army as an ensign then lieutenant in the grenadier horse guards. He then transferred, as a captain, to Lord Orkney's regiment and saw much action in Flander, where he was wounded at the siege of St Venant. He was in Ireland with his regiment at the time his father and brother took part in the Jacobite rising of 1715, which caused him to lose any chance of promotion in the army. He thus returned home to a commission in the foot guards.

At the general election in 1734, he was returned as one of the sixteen representative peers of Scotland.

He died on 25 July 1736. As he had no children, he was succeeded by his brother James Lindsay, 5th Earl of Balcarres.

References

 
 
 thepeerage.com
 The Balcarres history

1736 deaths
Alexander
Alexander
Year of birth unknown
Freemasons of the Premier Grand Lodge of England
Coldstream Guards officers